Mandy Walker , , , (born 1963) is an Australian cinematographer who has been Director of Photography on major Hollywood films including Mulan, Hidden Figures and Elvis, the latter of which earned her an Academy Award nomination for Best Cinematography. She was appointed a Member of the Order of Australia in the 2021 Queen's Birthday Honours.

Life and career
Born and raised in Melbourne, Victoria, Walker became interested in photography while a student in high school. After graduation she studied film criticism and cinema studies with John Flaus, who introduced her to several people working in the industry. She apprenticed as an unpaid assistant on several documentaries and music videos before shooting her first feature film, Return Home, at the age of twenty-five. Additional screen credits include Parklands, The Well, Lantana, Australian Rules, Shattered Glass, and Australia. Her television credits include the Australian Broadcasting Corporation series Raw FM.

Walker has filmed commercials for Nike, Toyota, Caltex, Cingular Wireless, Foxwoods Casino and, most notably, the spot for Chanel No. 5 directed by Baz Luhrmann and featuring Nicole Kidman.

The Australian Cinematographers Society honoured Walker with their Award of Distinction for Parklands and Lantana. She was nominated for the Australian Film Institute Award for Best Achievement in Cinematography for The Well, the Film Critics Circle of Australia Award for Best Cinematography for The Well and Lantana, and the Independent Spirit Award for Best Cinematography for Shattered Glass.

Walker was appointed a Member of the Order of Australia for "significant service to film as a cinematographer, and to professional societies" in the 2021 Queen's Birthday Honours. 

On 4 December 2022, she became the first woman to win a cinematography award at the AACTA Awards, for her work on Elvis. On 5 March 2023, she became the first woman to win the American Society of Cinematographers Award in the feature film category, also for Elvis.

Walker presently lives in Santa Monica, California.

Filmography
Film

Television
Raw FM (1997)

References

External links

Mandy Walker at the Internet Encyclopedia of Cinematographers

1963 births
Living people
Australian cinematographers
Australian women cinematographers
Members of the Order of Australia
People from Melbourne